Jagannath Temple in Ranchi, is a 17th-century temple dedicated to Lord Jagannath. It was built by king of Barkagarh Jagannathpur Thakur Ani Nath Shahdeo, in 1691. Completed on December 25, 1691, it is located about 10 km from the main town. The temple is on top of a small hillock.

Similar to the famous Jagannath Temple in Puri, Odisha, this temple is built in the same architectural style, although smaller, and similar to the Rath Yatra in Puri, an annual fair cum rath yatra is held at this temple in the month of Aashaadha, attracting thousands of tribal and non-tribal devotees not only from Ranchi but also from neighbouring villages and towns and is celebrated with much pomp and vigor.

Built on a hilltop, visitors most climb the stairs or take a vehicle. The temple was desecrated and vandalized by the Mughal Emperor Aurangzeb in the year 1691.

The temple collapsed on 6 August 1990 and was reconstructed on 8 February 1992.

References

External links

 History, Puja rituals, Rath Mela with the inputs from historians, the Pradhan Pujari, Mandir management committee, journalists and devotees, YouTube

Temples dedicated to Jagannath
Hindu temples in Jharkhand
Rebuilt buildings and structures in India
Ranchi